Jaša Prodanović (Čačak, Principality of Serbia, 23 April 1867 – Belgrade, Yugoslavia, 1 June 1948) was a Serbian politician and writer. Most of his life he fought against totalitarianism but in his senior years, he joined the communists to usurp the Old Order. In 1945, he became deputy prime minister of Socialist Federal Republic of Yugoslavia and held the post for three years until he died, endorsing the shift to totalitarian rule.

Early life and education 
Jaša Prodanović attended high schools in Čačak and Belgrade. He subsequently studied at the School of Mathematics and Natural Sciences at grandes écoles in Belgrade until 1890. While a student, he established ties with foreign Socialist youth movements. He was one of the editors of the collected writings of Svetozar Marković, his idol. He also edited the youth periodicals Srpska Misao and Narodna Misao.

Career

In 1890, Prodanović became a high school teacher and took up journalism and literary criticism. In 1901 he joined the Independent Radical Party (Samostalna Radikalna Stranka|SRS), a faction of the Radical Party. From 1902 to 1912 he edited SRS periodical, Odjek on an irregular basis. In 1903 he became a Member of Parliament. From 1909 to 1911 he served as minister of the economy in the government of Stojan Novaković and was instrumental in the adoption of a 1911 law on workers' insurance. In the 1920s he sharply criticized the way the parliamentary system functioned. He openly opposed the authoritarian style of King Alexander and criticized the constitution promulgated by the king on 3 September 1931. When World War II ended, he attended the Potsdam Conference as Minister for Serbia in the Provisional Government of Yugoslavia before he joined the communists to become the first deputy prime minister of the Socialist Federal Republic of Yugoslavia.

Works
He is best remembered as a writer. Prodanović edited anthologies of works by Jovan Ilić (1929), Svetislav Vulović (1932) and Jovan Jovanović Zmaj (1933-1937) as well as the collection Antologija narodne poezije (Anthology of National Poetry).

His selected works include:
 Ustavni razvitak i ustavne borbe u Srbiji (Constitutional developments and the struggle for a constitution in Serbia, 1936);
 Istorija politickih stranaka i struja u Serbiji (The history of political parties and influences in Serbia, 1947).

References 

1867 births
1948 deaths
Politicians from Čačak
Politicians from Belgrade
Members of the National Assembly (Serbia)
Deputy Prime Ministers of Serbia
Writers from Čačak
Education ministers of Serbia